Oxo or OXO may refer to:

Astronomy 
 Oxo (crater), an impact crater located in dwarf planet Ceres

Business 
 Oxo (food), a brand of food products in the UK, South Africa and Canada
 Oxo Tower, a London landmark formerly owned by the makers of Oxo food products
 OXO (kitchen utensils brand), a US-based manufacturer of ergonomic handheld kitchen utensils

Chemistry 
 Oxo ligand, a divalent ligand
 oxo-, a prefix in the formal IUPAC nomenclature for the functional group '=O' (a substituent oxygen atom connected to another atom by a double bond)
 Hydroformylation, an industrial process for the production of aldehydes from alkenes
 Oxo Biodegradable, degradation resulting from oxidative and cell-mediated phenomena, either simultaneously or successively
 Oxo alcohol, alcohols that are prepared by adding carbon monoxide (CO) and hydrogen

Computing 
 OXO (video game), the first digital graphical computer game, a version of tic-tac-toe from 1951

Music 
 OXO (band), an 80s New Wave pop band
 "OXO", a 2015, number one US dance song, by Olivia Somerlyn
 OxO - An Undiscovered Underground America rapper

Sports 
 Oxo (horse), a racehorse, winner of the 1959 Grand National

Other uses
 Tic-tac-toe (OXO, and various other synonyms) a pen-and-pencil game

See also
 Tic Tac Toe (disambiguation) 
 Noughts and crosses (disambiguation)